William Michael Harnett (August 10, 1848 – October 29, 1892) was an Irish-American painter known for his trompe-l'œil still lifes of ordinary objects.

Early life
Harnett was born in Clonakilty, County Cork, Ireland during the time of the Great Famine. Shortly after his birth his family emigrated to America, settling in Philadelphia. Becoming a United States citizen in 1868, he made a living as a young man by engraving designs on table silver, while also taking night classes at the Pennsylvania Academy of the Fine Arts and later, in New York, at Cooper Union and at the National Academy of Design. His first known oil painting, a still life, dates from 1874.

Work

The style of trompe-l'œil painting that Harnett developed was distinctive and inspired many imitators, but it was not without precedent. A number of  17th century Dutch painters, Pieter Claesz for instance, had specialized in tabletop still life of astonishing verisimilitude. Raphaelle Peale, working in Philadelphia in the early 19th century, pioneered the form in America. What sets Harnett's work apart, besides his enormous skill, is his interest in depicting objects not usually made the subject of a painting.

Harnett painted musical instruments, hanging game, and tankards, but also painted the unconventional Golden Horseshoe (1886), a single rusted horseshoe shown nailed to a board. He painted a casual jumble of second-hand books set on top of a crate, Job Lot, Cheap (1878), as well as firearms and even paper currency. His works sold well, but they were more likely to be found hanging in a tavern or a business office than in a museum, as they did not conform to contemporary notions of high art. 

Harnett spent the years 1880–1886 in Europe, staying in Munich from 1881 until early 1885. Harnett's best-known paintings,  the four versions of After The Hunt, were painted between 1883 and 1885. Each is an imposing composition of hunting equipment and dead game, hanging on a door with ornate hinges at the right and keyhole plate at the left. These paintings, like the horseshoe or currency depictions mentioned earlier, are especially effective as trompe-l'œil because the objects occupy a shallow space, meaning that the illusion is not spoiled by parallax shift if the viewer moves.

Overall, Harnett's work is most comparable to that of the slightly younger John F. Peto. The two artists knew each other, and a comparison can be made between two paintings featuring violins.  Harnett's Music and Good Luck from 1888 shows the violin hanging upright on a door with ornate hinges and with a slightly torn piece of sheet music behind it. The elements are arranged in a stable, deliberate manner. Peto's 1890 painting shows the violin hanging askew, as well as chipped and worn, with one string broken. The sheet music is dog-eared and torn around the edges, and placed haphazardly behind the instrument. The hinges are less ornate, and one is broken. Harnett's objects show signs of use but are well preserved, while Peto's more humble objects are nearly used up.

Later years and death

Crippling rheumatism plagued Harnett in his last years, reducing the number but not the quality of his paintings. He died in New York City in 1892 and was interred at the Old Cathedral Cemetery in Philadelphia, Pennsylvania. Other artists who painted similar compositions in Harnett's wake include his contemporary John Haberle and successors such as Otis Kaye, Jefferson David Chalfant, and Richard La Barre Goodwin.

Collections
Harnett's work is in collections in the Munson-Williams-Proctor Arts Institute (Utica, New York), Albright-Knox Art Gallery (Buffalo, New York), the Amon Carter Museum (Texas), the Dallas Museum of Art, the Art Institute of Chicago, the Brooklyn Museum of Art, the Carnegie Museum of Art (Pittsburgh), the Cincinnati Art Museum, the Cleveland Museum of Art, the Detroit Institute of Arts, the Fine Arts Museums of San Francisco, Harvard University Art Museums, the High Museum of Art (Atlanta, Georgia), the Honolulu Museum of Art, the Joslyn Art Museum (Nebraska), the Los Angeles County Museum of Art, the Metropolitan Museum of Art, the National Gallery of Art (Washington D.C.), the National Gallery of Canada (Ottawa), the Philadelphia Museum of Art, the San Diego Museum of Art (California), Thyssen-Bornemisza Museum (Madrid), the Toledo Museum of Art (Ohio), the Wadsworth Atheneum (Connecticut), and the Wichita Art Museum among others.

Gallery

Legacy

William M. Harnett was honored with a U.S. commemorative stamp in 1969, first placed on sale at Boston, Massachusetts, on December 3, 1969. The painting featured in the stamp is Old Models, which is held in the collection of the Boston Museum of Fine Arts.

Notes

References
Frankenstein, Alfred. The Reality of Appearance: The Trompe l'Oeil Tradition in American Painting. Greenwich, Connecticut: New York Graphic Society Ltd, 1970.

Further reading
 Frankenstein, Alfred. After the Hunt: William Harnett and other American Still Life Painters 1870–1900. Berkeley: University of California Press, 1953.

External links

A digitized scrapbook and two exhibition catalogs of William Harnett's work from The Metropolitan Museum of Art Libraries

1848 births
1892 deaths
19th-century American painters
American male painters
Cooper Union alumni
Irish emigrants to the United States (before 1923)
National Academy of Design alumni
Pennsylvania Academy of the Fine Arts alumni
People from County Cork
Irish still life painters
American still life painters
Trompe-l'œil artists